German submarine U-889 was a Type IXC/40 U-boat of Nazi Germany's Kriegsmarine during World War II.

Design
German Type IXC/40 submarines were slightly larger than the original Type IXCs. U-Y had a displacement of  when at the surface and  while submerged. She had two shafts and two  propellers.

U-Y was fitted with six  torpedo tubes (four fitted at the bow and two at the stern) with 22 torpedoes. Her main gun was a  SK C/32 naval gun with 180 rounds. For anti-aircraft defence it carried a  Flakzwilling M43U on the DLM42 mount as well as two twin  Flak 30 anti-aircraft guns.

The boat had a complement of forty-eight.

U-889 was fixed with the FuMB-26 Tunis antennae. The FuMB 26 Tunis combined the FuMB Ant. 24 Fliege and FuMB Ant. 25 Cuba II antennas. It could be mounted in either the Direction Finder Antenna Loop and separately on the bridge.

Service history
U-889 was laid down on 13 September 1943 at the DeSchiMAG AG Weser shipyard in Bremen and was commissioned on 4 August 1944, with Kapitänleutnant Friedrich Braeucker (Crew IV/37) as commander. Until 14 March 1945 she was attached to 4th U-boat Flotilla for training. She was then assigned to 33rd U-boat Flotilla, a combat unit based at Flensburg. Her first, and only, active patrol started on 5 April 1945. She sank no vessels before the war ended and subsequently surrendered to a Canadian patrol.

Surrender
After the German surrender on 8 May 1945, the German High Command ordered all U-boats to surrender. On the afternoon of 10 May, U-889 was spotted south of Newfoundland by a RCAF airplane, steaming at 10 knots and flying a black flag of surrender. The RCAF plane radioed to nearby Western Escort Force W-6 who intercepted the submarine an hour later. U-889 was ordered to head to Bay Bulls, Newfoundland. On 13 May, U-889 was turned over to the frigates  and  who escorted her to Shelburne Harbour where she was boarded and Braeucker, her commanding officer, made a formal surrender.

On 14 May 1945, U-889 was commissioned into the RCN and decommissioned in December 1945.

U-889 was one of ten U-boats allocated to the United States as part of the Tripartite Naval Commission sitting in Berlin in November 1945. She sailed to Portsmouth, New Hampshire on 10 January 1946 and experiments were conducted on her special hydrophone gear. She was sunk off Cape Cod on 20 November 1947.

See also
  - also captured and commissioned by the Royal Canadian Navy
 Military history of Nova Scotia

References

Bibliography

 Brief History of HMCS ROCKCLIFFE

External links

Ships built in Bremen (state)
German Type IX submarines
U-boats commissioned in 1944
U-boats sunk in 1947
Maritime incidents in 1947
1944 ships
World War II submarines of Germany
Submarines of the Royal Canadian Navy